Church of Peace, German: Friedenskirche, may refer to church institutions and building which carry Peace (Friede) in their names, including:

 Basilica of Our Lady of Peace, Ivory Coast
 Basilica of Our Lady of Peace
 Cathedral Basilica of Our Lady of Peace, Hawaii, U.S.
 Church of Heavenly Peace, Fuzhou, China
 Church of Our Lady of Peace, New York, N.Y., U.S.
 Church of Queen of Peace, Kričke, Croatia
 Church of Peace (Sanssouci) in Potsdam, Germany
 Churches of Peace, Silesia
 Churches of Peace in Jawor and Świdnica, Poland
 King of Peace Episcopal Church (Kingsland, Georgia), U.S.
 Maria, Königin des Friedens in Neviges, Germany
 Mary Queen of Peace Catholic Church Pottsville, Pennsylvania, U.S.
 Our Lady Queen of Peace Church, Richmond, U.S.
 Our Lady of Peace Church (Stratford, Connecticut), U.S.
 Our Lady of Peace Shrine, California, U.S.
 Peace Baptist Church, Birmingham, Alabama, U.S.
 Peace Church in Pennsylvania, U.S.
 Peace Church Bangladesh
 Peace churches
 Peace Lutheran Church (Friedenberg, Missouri), U.S.
 Prince of Peace Lutheran Church, Woodridge, Ill. U.S.
 Queen of Peace Church, Ebeye

See also
 Peace churches
 Our Lady of Peace
 Our Lady of Peace (disambiguation)